Absolute privilege is a complete defence to an action for defamation in English law. If the defence of absolute privilege applies it is irrelevant that a defendant has acted with malice, knew information was false or acted solely to damage the reputation of the plaintiff. Absolute privilege can be deployed in a narrow range of cases. Statements made in judicial proceedings are protected as are communications between a solicitor and their client. The Bill of Rights of 1689 provides that proceedings of the Parliament of the United Kingdom are also covered by absolute privilege.

Privileged statements

Reports of court proceedings

Sections 14(1) to (3) of the Defamation Act 1996 read:

The defence under this section is excluded by section 8(6) of the Rehabilitation of Offenders Act 1974 (as amended by subsection (4) of this section). That is, reporting on proceedings relating to a spent offence is not privileged.

Section 14 replaces section 3 of the Law of Libel Amendment Act 1888 and section 8 of the Defamation Act 1952. Subsection (3) was amended by the Defamation Act 2013.

Inquiries

Section 37(3) of the Inquiries Act 2005 provides:

Welsh Parliament / Senedd Cymru

Section 42 of the Government of Wales Act 2006 provides:

This section replaces section 77 of the Government of Wales Act 1998.

Reports by the Parliamentary Commissioner for Administration

Section 10(5) of the Parliamentary Commissioner Act 1967 provides:

Local Commissioner in Wales

Section 74 of the Local Government Act 2000 provides:

Fair trading

Section 82(2) of the Fair Trading Act 1973 provides:

Competition

Section 57 of the Competition Act 1998 provides:

Enterprise

Section 108 of the Enterprise Act 2002 provides:

Section 173 of that Act provides:

History
Section 69(2) of the Courts and Legal Services Act 1990 formerly provided:

See also
Parliamentary privilege

References

English law
English tort law
English privacy law
English defamation law